Romancoke is the name of either of two places on the mid-Atlantic seaboard of the United States:
 Romancoke, Maryland - an unincorporated community
 Romancoke, Virginia - an unincorporated community